Bossiaea nummularia is a species of flowering plant in the family Fabaceae and is endemic to New South Wales. It is a prostrate to low-lying sub-shrub with moderately hairy foliage, mostly broadly elliptic leaves, and yellow and red flowers.

Description

Taxonomy and naming
Bossiaea nummularia was first formally described in 1839 by Stephan Endlicher in Novarum Stirpium Decades from specimens grown in the garden of Charles von Hügel.

Distribution and habitat
This bossiaea grows in woodland and open forest, mostly in the Sydney region and in areas south of Goulburn.

References

nummularia
Mirbelioids
Flora of New South Wales
Plants described in 1839
Taxa named by Stephan Endlicher